Papua New Guinea competed at the 2017 Asian Indoor and Martial Arts Games held in Ashgabat, Turkmenistan from September 17 to 27. Papua New Guinea sent a delegation consisting of 9 athletes competing in 2 different sports. Papua New Guinea didn't receive any medal at the multi-sport event.

Papua New Guinea made its debut in an Asian Indoor and Martial Arts Games for the first time at the Games held in Turkmenistan along with other Oceania nations.

Participants

References 

2017 in Papua New Guinean sport
Nations at the 2017 Asian Indoor and Martial Arts Games